Camille Lecointre (born 25 February 1985 in Harfleur) is a French sailor.

Career
Lecointre competed in the 470 class at the 2012 Summer Olympics. She finished fourth with Mathilde Géron in that event. She was a bronze medalist in 470 at the 2015 World Championships and won the world title in 2016 with Hélène Defrance. Lecointre and Defrance were selected to compete in the 2016 Summer Olympics and they won the bronze medal in the women's 470 class.

Lecointre and Aloïse Retornaz won the 470 European Championships in 2019 and 2021. They also won the silver medal in 470 category at the 2019 Military World Games in Wuhan, and win the final of the Sailing World Cup in Marseille. Lecointre and Retornaz were awarded the 2019 Sailor of the Year award by the French Sailing Federation. Lecointre and Retornaz won the bronze medal at the 2020 Summer Olympics in the women's 470 event.

Personal life
Lecointre is married to Israeli skipper Gideon Kliger with whom she has a son born in 2017.

References

External links
 
 
 
 
 

1985 births
Living people
French female sailors (sport)
Olympic sailors of France
Sailors at the 2012 Summer Olympics – 470
Sailors at the 2016 Summer Olympics – 470
Sailors at the 2020 Summer Olympics – 470
People from Harfleur
Medalists at the 2016 Summer Olympics
Medalists at the 2020 Summer Olympics
Olympic medalists in sailing
Olympic bronze medalists for France
University of Western Brittany alumni
Mediterranean Games gold medalists for France
Mediterranean Games silver medalists for France
Competitors at the 2005 Mediterranean Games
Competitors at the 2013 Mediterranean Games
Universiade medalists in sailing
470 class world champions
World champions in sailing for France
Sportspeople from Brest, France
Sportspeople from Seine-Maritime
Mediterranean Games medalists in sailing
Universiade gold medalists for France
Medalists at the 2005 Summer Universiade
21st-century French women